Konstantine Gegelashvili (born 7 May 1983) is a Georgian water polo player for VK Locomotive Tbilisi and the Georgian national team.

He participated at the 2018 Men's European Water Polo Championship.

References

1983 births
Living people
Male water polo players from Georgia (country)